Shangri-La's Far Eastern Plaza Hotel Taipei is a five-star luxury hotel located in Da'an District, Taipei, Taiwan. It is managed by Shangri-La Hotels and Resorts. The hotel has 420 rooms and suites and opened in December 1994. 

Shangri-La's Far Eastern Plaza Hotel Taipei has received many distinguished guests in the past, including former U.S. President Bill Clinton, Hollywood movie stars Tom Cruise and Pierce Brosnan, action hero Jackie Chan, as well as directors Ang Lee and John Woo.

Design and Construction
Shangri-La's Far Eastern Plaza Hotel Taipei was designed by architects Palmer and Turner from Hong Kong and Chu-Yuan Lee from Taiwan as part of the Far Eastern Plaza complex in the center of the city. The original interior design was created by Chhada Siembieda Remedios Inc., taking inspiration from the Song Dynasty, featuring era-inspired sculptures and specially commissioned paintings throughout the hotel.

Features
The hotel has 420 rooms of which 53 are suites. The hotel also has six restaurants, 3 bars and lounges, a rooftop pool and a Shiseido-branded spa.

Restaurants
Café at Far Eastern: A buffet restaurant with open-kitchen and 12 themed gourmet zones offering cuisines from around the world.
ibuki: A Japanese style restaurant offering a wide range of Japanese dishes, including teppanyaki and sushi.
Marco Polo: An Italian restaurant with a view of Taipei.
Shang Palace: A Cantonese restaurant providing dim sum and a selection of other traditional delicacies.
Shanghai Pavilion: A Shanghainese restaurant on the 39th floor, with a view of Taipei's skyline.
The Cake Room: A pastry shop offering a variety of breads, cakes, pastries and desserts.

Bars and Lounges
Li Bai Lounge: East and West fusion style bar. 
Lobby Court: A gin bar with over 40 brands of gin from around the world and live music performances.
Marco Polo Lounge: Located on the top floor, the lounge provides afternoon tea featuring handmade sandwiches and delicate desserts with a view of the Taipei 101.

Awards
It was voted the “Best Business Hotel in Taipei” by CNN Business Traveller Asia Pacific for five consecutive years and recently voted as “The Most Fabulous Hotel in Taiwan” by EZtravel.

Gallery

See also
 Shangri-La's Far Eastern Plaza Hotel Tainan
 Shangri-La Hotels and Resorts
 Far Eastern Plaza

References

External links

 Shangri-La Far Eastern, Taipei official site

Shangri-La Hotels and Resorts
Hotel buildings completed in 1994
1994 establishments in Taiwan
Skyscraper hotels in Taipei
Hotels established in 1994